Comrade Pedersen is a 2006 Norwegian drama film directed by Hans Petter Moland, starring Kristoffer Joner and Ane Dahl Torp. It is set in the late 1960s and 1970s and tells the story of a high-school teacher who tries to settle down in a small industrial town and gets caught up in the then trending Marxist-Leninist movement in Norway. The film is an adaptation of Dag Solstad's 1982 novel Gymnaslærer Pedersens beretning om den store politiske vekkelse som har hjemsøkt vårt land ("Gymnasium teacher Pedersen's report on the great political awakening that has haunted our country").

The film premiered on 24 February 2006. Moland received the Best Director award at the Montreal World Film Festival. Dahl Torp received the prize for Best Actress at the 2006 Amanda Awards.

Cast
 Kristoffer Joner as school teacher Knut Pedersen
 Ane Dahl Torp as Nina Skåtøy
 Anne Ryg as Lise Tanner
 Jan Gunnar Røise as Werner Ludal
 Stig Henrik Hoff as Jan Klåstad
 Fridtjov Såheim as Gunnar Bøe
 Silje Torp as Anne Britt Bru
 Jon Øigarden as Harald Tholfsen
 Elin Sogn as Unni Langmoen
 Henriette Steenstrup as Mrs. Bøe
 Robert Skjærstad as Unni Langmoen's husband
 Linn Skåber as principal

References

2006 drama films
2006 films
Films based on Norwegian novels
Films directed by Hans Petter Moland
Films set in Norway
Norwegian drama films